Gerhard IV ( – 1323), was Count of Holstein-Plön from 1312 until his death.

Life 
He was the eldest son of Gerhard II and his wife, Ingeborg of Sweden.  He inherited Holstein-Plön; on 7 June 1314, he sold most of his inheritance to his brother John III.

Marriage and issue 
He married on 30 July 1313 to Anastasia of Schwerin ( – after 1316), a daughter of Nicholas I of Schwerin, and had the following children with her:
 Gerhard V of Holstein-Plön ( – 22 September 1350), canon at Lübeck Cathedral, potential future Count of Holstein-Plön until his early death.

 Ingeborg ( – after 1349), married to Count Conrad I Oldenburg; they were parents of Christian V, Count of Oldenburg

Seals 

An early seal from his time as Provost of Lübeck reads:

"Seal of Gerhard, provost of Lübeck by the grace of God"

Ancestors

References 
 Verein für Lübecksche Geschichte und Alterthumskunde: Siegel des Mittelalters aus den Archiven der Stadt Lübeck, Lübeck, 1862-1865

Plön
Counts of Holstein
House of Schauenburg
1277 births
1323 deaths
13th-century German nobility
14th-century German nobility